George Dwight Waring (October 14, 1819 – January 11, 1893) was a member of the Wisconsin State Senate.

Biography
Waring was born on October 14, 1819, in Masonville, New York. He moved to Berlin, Wisconsin, in 1855. He died in Dallas in 1893.

Career
Waring was originally elected to the Senate in 1868. Previously, he was Mayor of Berlin from 1857 to 1861 and District Attorney of Green Lake County, Wisconsin, from 1861 to 1865. He was a Republican.

References

External links

People from Delaware County, New York
People from Berlin, Wisconsin
Republican Party Wisconsin state senators
Mayors of places in Wisconsin
District attorneys in Wisconsin
1819 births
1893 deaths
19th-century American politicians